Verdigre Creek is a stream in Knox and Antelope counties, in the U.S. state of Nebraska.

Verdigre is derived from the Spanish word verde meaning "green"; the name was applied to the stream for the green soil on its banks. Verdigre Creek was previously also known as Mauvaius River. The creek begins near  where its tributaries, South Branch Verdigre Creek and East Branch Verdigre Creek converge on the mainstream, from there the creek flows through Verdigre, Nebraska and its mouth opens into the Niobrara River at  about eight miles north of the town.

See also

List of rivers of Nebraska

References

Rivers of Antelope County, Nebraska
Rivers of Knox County, Nebraska
Rivers of Nebraska
Wild and Scenic Rivers of the United States